Dangerously Yours may refer to:

 Dangerously Yours (1933 film), an American film directed by Frank Tuttle 
 Dangerously Yours (1937 film), an American film directed by Malcolm St. Clair